Juan Patricio Borghetti Imérito (born December 5, 1973, in Buenos Aires) is an  Argentine actor and singer.

Life

At the age of fourteen, he formed his first rock band, which was called "Sur" ("South"). He later worked as a model and appeared in some episodes of Argentine telenovelas. In the mid 1990s, Borghetti arrived in Mexico, where he later starred in the musical telenovela DKDA, in which he played Axel Harris, his first stellar role. He has also participated in El Juego de la Vida and Rebelde. He participated in Atrevete a Soñar, and Esperanza del Corazón. He previously participated in Teresa (2010 Telenovela).

External links

 Patricio Borghetti at Es Mas

1973 births
Living people
Argentine people of Italian descent
Male actors from Buenos Aires
Naturalized citizens of Mexico
Argentine emigrants to Mexico
Argentine male telenovela actors
20th-century Argentine male singers
Mexican male telenovela actors